The men's road race at the 1971 UCI Road World Championships was the 38th edition of the event. The race took place on Sunday 5 September 1971 in Mendrisio, Switzerland. The race was won by Eddy Merckx of Belgium.

Final classification

References

Men's Road Race
UCI Road World Championships – Men's road race
1971 Super Prestige Pernod